Zhao Yupei (born July 1954) is a Chinese surgeon and politician who is the current president of the Chinese Medical Association, in office since May 2021. Previously he served as president of Peking Union Medical College Hospital.

He was an alternate member of the 18th and 19th Central Committee of the Chinese Communist Party.

Biography
Zhao was born in Changchun, Jilin, in July 1954. He graduated from Norman Bethune Medical University (now Norman Bethune Health Science Center of Jilin University) in 1982 before gaining a master's degree in medical science from China Union Medical University (now Graduate School of Peking Union Medical College) in 1987.

Starting in 1987, he served in several posts in Peking Union Medical College Hospital, including deputy director and than director of Surgery, deputy dean of Department of Surgery. In December 2007, he was promoted to become president of Peking Union Medical College Hospital, a position he held until November 2020. In May 2021, he was chosen as president of the Chinese Medical Association, replacing Ma Xiaowei.

Honours and awards
 2005 Member of the American College of Surgeons
 2007 Honorary Fellowship of the Royal College of Surgery, England
 2010 Science and Technology Progress Award of the Ho Leung Ho Lee Foundation
 December 2011 Member of the Chinese Academy of Sciences (CAS)

References

1954 births
Living people
People from Changchun
Jilin University alumni
Peking Union Medical College alumni
People's Republic of China politicians from Jilin
Chinese Communist Party politicians from Jilin
Members of the Chinese Academy of Sciences
Alternate members of the 18th Central Committee of the Chinese Communist Party
Alternate members of the 19th Central Committee of the Chinese Communist Party